Ufa rail bridge carries double tracked rail lines over the River Belaya. It is located at Ufa, the Republic of Bashkortostan, Russia.

History
The origins of the bridge are closely associated with that of the Trans-Siberian Railway line, for which the structure was built for. Construction of the bridge occurred between 1886 and 1888, having been built at the same time as several other railway bridges on the line, including three-span bridge across the River Ufa, east of Ufa. Both bridges were designed by civil engineer Professor Nikolai Belelubsky under the specifications for steel railway bridges of 1884 edition, hence design features are shared between these two bridges. The bridges made it possible to extend the Trans-Siberian line further east, toward the Siberian towns of Zlatoust (1890) and Chelyabinsk (1892).

For the design of the bridges, Professor Nikolai Belelubsky was called in. Belelubsky has greatly contributed to the study of construction materials, having made, at least, two important discoveries: he established that domestic cement was no worse than the British one. This has greatly cheapened the process of bridge building. The second crucial breakthrough of Belelubsky was remarkable progress toward understanding the mechanical properties of carbon steel. In 1882, Belelubsky was the first in Russia to raise the question of whether steel should be used in the construction of railway bridges. This proposal was not immediately supported by the Ministry of Railways, obviously because steel had not yet been systematically used in metal bridges in Austria, while in Germany it had been used with some caution under specifications of that day. Having assessed the physical and chemical properties of carbon steel, Belelubsky concluded that, contrary to the widespread opinion of the time, steel would be a much more reliable material in bridge building, compared to wrought iron. Belelubsky managed to achieve that steel replaced wrought iron in the construction of bridges on the four major sections of the Trans-Siberian Railroad. The specifications for steel that had been developed by Belelubsky formed the foundation for similar specifications developed later abroad.

The bridge superstructure provided originally for six 109-meter (358 ft.) bowstring arch through truss spans over the river channel, with steel box girders. This design required a careful alignment of the top and floor members (chords) and the members between the chords (web members) that were fabricated of steel. All of the structural elements for the bridge project were fabricated at the famous Votkinsk ironworks (now the Votkinsk Machine Building Plant) in Udmurtia, where starting from 1871, open hearth furnaces began to be widely used that made it possible to produce rails for the country's railroad network. 

Belelubsky also proposed an innovative constructive solution called the 'free carriageway' that uses pin connected members in a freely chosen angle. This design allowed to shorten the length of panels making the structural frames easier and reducing secondary stresses in the truss members. The presence of vertical load-bearing members greatly simplified the design of cradles, base frames and structural connections used in the trusses. Such a type of connecting method was considered to be groundbreaking in the days of Belelubsky, hence it received a gold medal at the Edinburg Exposition 1890 and later came to be known as the 'Russian type of design'.

The truss superstructure was set on masonry piers that were reinforced by triangular buttresses (cutwaters) pointing upstream to break up ice that floats downstream in spring. The clear head room was 17 metres (56 ft.) above mean high water. 

On 8 September 1888, the bridge was solemnly opened to traffic by admiral Konstantin Posyet, Minister of Railway Transport. Pedestrian traffic was immediately opened on the bridge: for this purpose special wooden footways were made (but subsequently pedestrian traffic was closed).

Bridge during the Civil War

In June 1919, the battles of the Russian Civil War took place directly around the town of Ufa. After taking heavy casualties, the retreating troops of Admiral Kolchak withdrew in all haste. Attempting to prevent pursuit, the Kolchak troops blew up the sixth (right-bank) span of the bridge. The blast was triggered by firing on wagons with explosives placed in the span. One end of the truss knocked off its piers, fell into the river and was severely damaged. But this didn't help the Whites to achieve their goal, because the famous 25th Rifle Division of Chapaev captured the town on 9 June 1919.

As Kolchak's troops retreated, the forward detachments (peredovye otriady) of the Red Army moved further, while their rear units remained on the right bank of the Belay near Ufa. Meanwhile, the crossing was in urgent need of rehabilitation. Lack of materials delayed the 'rehab job' for some time, and since there was no appropriate construction equipment available, manual labor was only hope. It was decided to use scaffolding for putting the fallen truss back into place. Inch by inch, step by step, they were as if the ancient Egyptians who dragged and lifted massive stones, when building the pyramids, but none of them seemed to care about Pharaonic times.

The restoration involved approximately 2,500 construction workers and railway engineers. Day by day, week after week, and the fallen truss no longer towered desperately over the river. The bridge was successfully restored in the same year by temporarily installing the damaged truss, followed by a complete overhaul, during which the damaged one was demolished and replaced with a new truss designed by Prof. Lavr Proskouriakov under the specifications of 1907 edition. Proskouriakov had designed the largest rail bridges in Russian Empire over the Yenisey and Amur rivers.

Thanks to careful preparation, the workers replaced the damaged span with minimal traffic disruption - in just 11 hours. It took 7 hours for pushing the old span off the piers by using jack-ups, and it took 3 hours 45 minutes for putting the new truss into place. On October 10, 1919, Vladimir Lenin sent a congratulatory telegram to the bridge-building crew to express his appreciation for their hardwork.

Renovation 
There is an old data sheet on the bridge that has been preserved in the archives of the Ufa city permanent way department, which contains the following record made in 1928: "Trains with double-headed 0-10-0 Class locomotives and american gondola wagons are not allowed to pass over the bridge. During the passage of trains with a single-headed 0-10-0 locomotive, the maximum speed is limited to 8 km per hour (5 mph)".

During the 20th century, the bridge has been renovated several times. So, between 1937 and 1939, to cope with increasing traffic, the bridge underwent strengthening with oversize removal and addition of reinforcing metal up to 4% of the weight of the trusses.

Between 1949 and 1951, the bridge was rebuilt for double-track. The reconstruction was carried out by the construction train Nº417. The bridge’s piers were remodeled by constructing ferroconcrete pylons on the foundations of the former cutwaters that were no longer relevant, and on them a new superstructure was erected, consisting of unified trusses fabricated under Proektstalkonstruktsia specifications of 1943 edition for Class N-7 loading.

Between 1991 and 2001, the bridge was again subject to structural repairs. The outdated superstructure that lacked the structural capacity to meet the current needs of the day was replaced with a new one consisting of unified trusses designed for Class S-14 loading. The superstructure, designed for the small engines and light wagons, was not strong enough for present-day loads, as traffic levels increased. Open joint-stock company Transstroimost was the prime contractor for the remedial works on the bridge. By now, all the outdated elements have been replaced, hence there is no need for concern about the strength of the structure and the safety of the crossing.

Bridge across the River Ufa 
Ufa rail bridge across the Ufa River carries double tracked rail lines over the Ufa River. It is also located in the city of Ufa, near the station of Urakovo (Shaksha). Its design and history were almost the same as the bridge over the Belaya River. It was also designed by Prof. Nikolai Belelubsky under the specifications of 1884 edition, but it had only three spans, each 109 metres (358,432 ft) long.

In 1919, during the Civil War, the 3rd left-bank span of the bridge was blown up by the Kolchak's retreating troops, and collapsed. In 1920, the destroyed truss was replaced with a new one designed by civil engineer and Prof. Proskouriakov under the specifications of 1907 edition.

Between 1939 and 1940, the truss superstructure was substantially strengthened with oversize removal and addition of reinforcing metal up to 4% of the weight of the trusses.

Between 1951 and 1952, the bridge was rebuilt for double-track. The reconstruction was carried out by the construction train Nº414. The piers were remodeled by constructing new ferroconcrete pylons on the foundations of the former cutwaters that were no longer relevant, and on them a new superstructure was erected consisting of unified trusses fabricated under Ghiprotrans specifications of 1931 edition for Class N-7 loading.

Between 2001 and 2002, the outdated superstructure was replaced with a new one consisting of unified trusses designed for Class S-14 loading. Open joint-stock company USK MOST was the contractor for the remedial works on the bridge.

Interesting facts

 When the bridge was completed in 1888, the course of the Dyoma River was straightened by digging an artificial channel that begins about 100 metres (329 ft) downstream from the present-day highway bridge near the cafe 'Goldfish'. The river course was straightened artificially to avoid building another bridge over the Dyoma. In fact, the Dyoma emptied into the Belaya a few kilometres downstream (into the current oxbow lake that was the main channel of the Belaya until 1854). But in 1854, during heavy flooding, the Belaya jumped its banks, carving a new channel. The old river section was cut off from the channel, forming an oxbow lake. The new course that goes right around Nizhegorodka (the Lower city) was then a wide duct, exceedingly low and fordable in many places. The area that surrounds now the village of Kozorez was a big island.
 The first color pictures of the bridge were taken by Sergey Prokudin-Gorsky in 1910. The process of photography was carried out by the method of registering on a single glass plate three separate images taken through the blue, green and red filters.
 To the upstream of the bridge, there exists a small island that changes its outlines annually, becoming a peninsula in summer. It emerged due to the fact that two barges carrying bread had sunk on this place at the beginning of the 20th century, forming the foundation for sediment layers that eventually broke the water’s surface.

See also
 Nikolai Belelubsky
 Lavr Proskuryakov
 Trans-Siberian Railway

References

Notes

Sources
 Уфа, губернский город // Энциклопедический словарь Брокгауза и Ефрона: В 86 томах (82 т. и 4 доп.). — СПб., 1890-1907.  
 История Уфы: краткий очерк / Ганеев Р.Г., Болтушкин В.В., Кузеев Р.Г.. — Уфа: Башкирское книжное издательство, 1981. — 604 с. 
 Синенко С.Г. Город над Белой рекой. Краткая история Уфы в очерках и зарисовках 1574-2000. — Уфа: Государственное республиканское издательство «Башкортостан», 2002. — 5000 экз. 
 Нигматуллина И.В. Старая Уфа. Историко-краеведческий очерк.. — Уфа: Белая река, 2007. — 224 с. — 3000 экз. —

External links
 Ufa City Bridges (Black & White)  
 Education in Russia for Foreigners: University cities of Russia. Ufa
 Official website of Ufa
 Ufa virtual tour
 360 Panoramas of Ufa
 Photos of Ufa

Bridges completed in 1888
Railway bridges in Russia
Transport in Ufa
Truss bridges
Railway lines in Russia